Rupert Wood (12 November 1917 – 5 January 1968) was a Barbadian cricketer. He played in five first-class matches for the Barbados cricket team from 1933 to 1939.

See also
 List of Barbadian representative cricketers

References

External links
 

1917 births
1968 deaths
Barbadian cricketers
Barbados cricketers
People from Saint Philip, Barbados